Shooting sports have been contested at the Commonwealth Games at every games since 1966 with the exception of the 1970 and 2022 Commonwealth Games. 

Events were open until they were segregated by gender in 1994 for pistol and most rifle events and in 2002 for trap and skeet events; the full bore rifle competitions remained open.

Editions

Shooting in the Commonwealth Games after 2018

2022 Games 
Shooting is an optional sport at the Commonwealth Games, but had been routinely included since 1974. In January 2018 it was announced that shooting would not feature in the 2022 Games programme, citing a lack of facilities near Birmingham. In December 2018, a delegation including the International Shooting Sport Federation and British Shooting visited Birmingham and discussed the addition of shooting with the Birmingham Organising Committee. In June 2019 is was reported that this proposal had been unsuccessful.

In response, India - who count Shooting as one of their most successful sports - threatened to boycott the 2022 Games in their entirety. In September 2019, Indian Olympic Association (IOA) President Narinder Batra stated that the Games "are a waste of time and money" and that India should withdraw. Batra's comments drew broad criticism from Indian athletes.

In January 2020, the IOA submitted a proposal to the Commonwealth Games Federation (CGF) to host a combined archery and shooting championships in Chandigarh during January 2022. The CGF Executive Board approved the proposal in February 2020, and also confirmed that the 2022 Commonwealth Shooting and Archery Championships and the 2022 Commonwealth Games would be two separately organised and funded Commonwealth Sport events. In July 2021, the CGF announced that the event had been cancelled due to the COVID-19 pandemic in India.

2026 Games 
In July 2022, the organising committee for the 2026 Commonwealth Games released their programme, which also did not include shooting. India expressed strong disappointment, raising the matter with organisers from Victoria during the Birmingham Games. In August 2022, Shooting Australia announced that the ISSF has submitted a proposal for shooting when the expression of interest period for additional sports opened. Like the proposals for the 2022 Games, the programme was significantly restricted and included just four disciplines - Skeet, Air Rifle, Air Pistol and Fullbore Rifle. This dropped cartridge pistol, 50m rifle, trap and double trap. "Para-Shooting" events were also promised, though it was not specified whether this was limited to airgun disciplines or included Para-Skeet, as demonstrated at the 2017 CSF(ED) Championships in Wales.

In October 2022, the inclusion of Shooting was confirmed, but without Fullbore Rifle. It was later announced that Shooting would be held in the Gippsland region, east of Melbourne. The proposal had originally been based in Greater Bendigo, north of Melbourne - to use the Wellsford Fullbore Rifle Range (which also hosted the 2006 Commonwealth Games fullbore events).

There is concern as to the continuation of meaningful CSF Championships, as test events for the Games would typically follow the Games programme - not a full programme. This has also raised concerns over funding for both the Championships and participating teams as this has traditionally been drawn from Games budgets as part of preparations.

Events
Men's events

Women's events

Open events

All-time medal table
Updated after the 2018 Commonwealth Games

Games records
Due to ISSF Finals format changes, all 2018 finals set Games Records by default.

References

 
Commonwealth Games
Shooting